Dominic MacHale is an Irish actor. He is best known for his role as Sergeant Healy in the 2016 comedy film The Young Offenders. He went on to reprise his role in the 2018 television series of the same name, produced by the BBC. He started acting while working towards his BSc in Microbiology in University College Cork, which he gained in 2010. The Young Offenders was his first film role. Until then he had been mainly a theatre actor. His father is the academic Des MacHale.

Filmography

Film

Television

References

External links
 

Living people
21st-century Irish actors
Irish male film actors
Irish male television actors
People from County Cork
Year of birth missing (living people)